Eukaryotic translation initiation factor 2-alpha kinase 1 is an enzyme that in humans is encoded by the EIF2AK1 gene.

Function 
EIF2AK1 inhibits protein synthesis at the translation initiation level, in response to various stress conditions, including oxidative stress, heme deficiency, osmotic shock and heat shock. EIF2AK1 exerts its function through the phosphorylation of EIF2S1 at 'Ser-48' and 'Ser-51', thus preventing its recycling. Binds hemin forming a 1:1 complex through a cysteine thiolate and histidine nitrogenous coordination. This binding occurs with moderate affinity, allowing it to sense the heme concentration within the cell. Owing to this unique heme-sensing capacity, it plays a crucial role in shutting off protein synthesis during acute heme-deficient conditions. In red blood cells (RBCs), it controls hemoglobin synthesis ensuring a coordinated regulation of the synthesis of the heme and globin moieties of hemoglobin. Thus plays an essential protective role for RBC survival in anemias of iron deficiency. Similarly, in hepatocytes, involved in heme-mediated translational control of CYP2B and CYP3A and possibly other hepatic P450 cytochromes. EIF2AK1 also act to moderate ER stress during acute heme-deficient conditions.

Enzymology 
EIF2AK1 is a kinase, thus it catalyses the following reaction:

ATP + a protein = ADP + a phosphoprotein

EIF2AK1 is induced by acute heme depletion, that not only increases EIF2AK1 protein levels, but also stimulates kinase activity by autophosphorylation. Inhibited by the heme-degradation products biliverdin and bilirubin. Induced by oxidative stress generated by arsenite treatment. Binding of nitric oxide (NO) to the heme iron in the N-terminal heme-binding domain activates the kinase activity, while binding of carbon monoxide (CO) suppresses kinase activity.
 
cite:https://www.uniprot.org/uniprot/Q9BQI3
The HRI gene is localized to 7p22 where its 3' end slightly overlaps the 3' end of the gene JTV1. The two genes are transcribed from opposite strands. Studies in rat and rabbit suggest that the HRI gene product phosphorylates the alpha subunit of eukaryotic initiation factor 2. Its kinase activity is induced by low levels of heme and inhibited by the presence of heme.

References

Further reading

EC 2.7.11